Appropriate Adult is a British crime drama television film shown in two parts on ITV, on 4 and 11 September 2011. It is based on the true story of Gloucester serial killer Fred West and his wife Rosemary West. It dealt with the events between the Wests' arrests in February 1994 and Fred's suicide in Birmingham's Winson Green Prison on New Year's Day 1995. The series stars Dominic West, Monica Dolan and Emily Watson as the protagonists of the story, Fred and Rose West, and Janet Leach, respectively.

The series was named after the role of Janet Leach as an "appropriate adult" during the questioning of Fred West. The senior investigator wanted to ensure that there could be no suggestion that West did not understand any part of the process, so arrangements were made so that he had an "appropriate adult" present to ensure this at all times.

It was well received critically and received eight BAFTA television award nominations, with West and Watson winning the best actor and actress awards respectively, Dolan the best supporting actress award and co-producer Kwadjo Dajan the breakthrough talent award.

Plot 
In Gloucester in February 1994, housewife Janet Leach is an appropriate adult, someone present during police interviews with children or vulnerable adults. She attends a police interview with Fred West, who confesses to killing his daughter. Fred privately tells Janet there were more victims, but appropriate adults cannot share conversations. After the police find the remains of more than one person at the West home, Fred says the other victim is a lodger, Shirley, who was pregnant with his child.

Janet is given the opportunity to leave the case due to its distressing nature but resolves to continue. West tells the police there is a third body in the garden. DC Hazel Savage suspects his first wife and stepdaughter are also buried there, and that Fred's wife Rose was complicit, but Fred denies this. Fred appears surprised to learn that Shirley's baby had been removed from her abdomen, and tells Janet that Rose must have removed it.

Fred tells Janet he feels they have a connection. Disgusted, she decides to leave the case, but he begs her to stay. She agrees on the condition that he confess everything, and he confesses to "approximately" nine murders. The police begin digging in the Wests' basement and in the countryside, where West indicates a different area to Janet, and reminisces about his "true love", Anna McFall. DSI John Bennett is concerned that Fred's confession might have been made under duress or fabricated to impress Janet, and warns her not to get too close to him.

Janet is approached by the media. Her partner Mike, who has bipolar, urges her to sell her story. He has a manic episode and is admitted to hospital. Janet's son Josh accuses her of having neglected the family. Fred tells Janet that he and Rose agreed to have Fred take the blame for the murders so Rose could look after the family. He calls Janet "Anna" and insists they are going on a journey together.

The police find remains of several more victims. Fred leads the police to a rural location, where he says he feels Anna's presence; he tells Janet that Anna is "guiding" him through her. Savage tells Janet that Anna was Fred's teenage babysitter while he was married to Catherine in 1967; they had an affair and she went missing.

Fred and Rose are jointly charged with murder and Savage tells Janet she is no longer required. Her family life resumes until Fred calls her from prison; she agrees to help him find a solicitor, to the dismay of Josh and Mike. A twelfth body is identified as Anna. With Janet's help, Fred begins writing a memoir.

Mike and Janet meet a journalist who suspects that the Wests may have been involved in the ritual killings of children. She agrees to sell information to him. Fred describes to Janet hearing the screams of children in a barn, and that there were at least 20 more murders. When Janet cancels her Christmas visit, Fred calls her, saying he sees more of Anna in her than in Rose.

Fred hangs himself in prison. As her duty of confidence no longer applies, she recounts everything Fred told her. Bennett dismisses Fred's book and tells her that Janet meant nothing to him. At home, Mike catches Janet preparing to swallow pills. She confesses that she misses feeling needed and important.

In court, Janet testifies that Fred described Rose as sadistic and murderous. She lies that she has never spoken to the media about the case and collapses. Appearing in court again, she admits that she had sold her story. The defence accuses her of encouraging Fred to invent lurid stories, and suggests she was romantically involved with him. She testifies that she was only interested in the truth, and Rose is found guilty. The journalist finds a location matching Fred's description of the barn, but Janet expresses doubt that the truth will ever be known and returns to family life.

Production
The film was directed by Julian Jarrold and written by Neil McKay. The production was headed by ITV executive producer Jeff Pope, who considered it as the concluding feature in a trilogy of films about the most notorious British murder cases of the past century, the previous films being This Is Personal: The Hunt for the Yorkshire Ripper and See No Evil: The Moors Murders, which won multiple awards. Co-producer Kwadjo Dajan researched and developed the project over four years after establishing contact with Janet Leach and consulting with Gloucestershire Constabulary. The drama was filmed over seven weeks in Manchester. Dominic West's physical resemblance to West was noted during filming. Fred West's daughter Mae West said he "captured the evil essence of him – his character, his mannerisms, even his gait". Janet Leach found it difficult to approach Dominic West in character on set because he was so convincing that it took her back seventeen years to her work with the murderer.

Cast
 Dominic West as Fred West 		
 Emily Watson as Janet Leach
 Monica Dolan as Rose West
 Robert Glenister as D.S.I. John Bennett
 Sylvestra Le Touzel as D.C. Hazel Savage
 Samuel Roukin as D.C. Darren Law	
 Anthony Flanagan as Mike
 Stanley Townsend as Syd Young
 Gerard Horan as Howard Ogden
 Seline Hizli as Mae West
 James McArdle as Stephen West
 Rupert Simonian as Josh Leach
 Jasper Jacob as Brian Leveson QC
 Jack Fortune as Richard Ferguson QC
 Vincent Brimble as Mr Justice Mantell
 Robert Whitelock as D.C. Carl Kempinsky

Reception

Critics
The first episode was met with positive reviews after it was broadcast on 4 September 2011. Sam Wollaston from The Guardian described it as "beautifully done, not sensational or hysterical". A later article by Phil Hogan in The Observer and The Guardian described Dominic West's performance as "worryingly close" but said "even with a set of chipped teeth, bad jumper choices and a rattling West Country burr, handsome Dominic could not quite conjure the Fred familiar from his demonic police mug shot. What he did conjure, in one impressively seamless personality, were the strange warring traits of a man cheerfully sane and yet not quite there – helpful but manipulative, confiding but controlling, troubled but carefree, a composite that perfectly explained why the police wanted the presence of an 'appropriate adult'". Hogan was also impressed with Monica Dolan's highly convincing performance as Rosemary, which he described as "literally spitting-mad". ITV claims that several daughters of the Wests and the families of the victims spoke positively about the series after having viewed it.

Detective Superintendent Bennett
Following its broadcast, the programme was also criticised by retired Gloucestershire Detective Superintendent John Bennett who said, 
"the series went far beyond any justifiable claims of 'dramatic licence' and 'simplification' by creating dialogue and scenes which did not take place at all, these just sensationalising the story and not furthering it, wrongly depicting how Janet Leach was treated and her involvement, giving her a kudos she far from deserves". "This series painting her as a 'victim' and wrongly portraying the sequence of events and her contact with and payment by the Mirror Group whilst grossly exaggerating her involvement is an insult to the true victims, their families, which very much includes the extended family of the Wests, the witnesses who so courageously gave evidence, the investigating team, and its professionalism, also the many professionals and others who worked so hard to unravel the horrific crimes and bring the Wests and others to justice". However, he concurred that "the mannerisms and psyche of Frederick West captured and enacted by Dominic West and Monica Dolan of Rosemary West are hauntingly accurate".

In response to Bennett's statement, ITV's Janice Troup issued the following response:

Awards
Appropriate Adult was nominated for eight BAFTA awards at the 2012 British Academy Television Awards. Dominic West and Emily Watson won their respective leading players categories, while Monica Dolan won the best supporting actress award and Kwadjo Dajan was the winner of the breakthrough talent category. Other nominations included best mini series, director, production design and writer.

References

External links
 

2011 British television series debuts
2011 British television series endings
2010s British crime drama television series
British serial killer films
2010s British television miniseries
English-language television shows
ITV television dramas
Television series by ITV Studios
Television series set in the 1990s
Television series set in 1994
Television series set in 1995
Television shows set in Gloucestershire
Television controversies in the United Kingdom
True crime television series
Cultural depictions of male serial killers
Cultural depictions of female serial killers
Cultural depictions of British men
Cultural depictions of British women
Films directed by Julian Jarrold